This is a list of notable artists in the field of BDSM art: 

 Nobuyoshi Araki
 Gene Bilbrew
 Robert Bishop
 Charles Guyette 
 Jeff Gord
 Erich von Götha de la Rosière
 Sadao Hasegawa
 Namio Harukawa
 Seiu Ito
 Eric Kroll
 Monica Majoli
 Michael Manning
 Robert Mapplethorpe
 Ken Marcus
 Daido Moriyama
 Fakir Musafar
 Helmut Newton
 Barbara Nitke
 Satine Phoenix
 Rex
 Sardax
 Franco Saudelli
 Bill Schmeling
 Stjepan Sejic
 Joe Shuster
 Eric Stanton
 Roy Stuart
 Bill Ward
 John Willie

See also: List of BDSM photographers

See also
List of fetish artists

Further reading
 Eric Stanton & the History of the Bizarre Underground by Richard Pérez Seves. Atglen, Schiffer Publishing, 2018. 

Bondage artists
BDSM